Achyra prionogramma is a moth in the family Crambidae. It was described by Edward Meyrick in 1886. It is found on New Guinea.

References

Moths described in 1886
Moths of New Guinea
Pyraustinae
Taxa named by Edward Meyrick